SCSI standalone enclosure services is a computer protocol used mainly with disk storage enclosures.  It allows a host computer to communicate with the enclosure to access its power, cooling, and other non-data characteristics.  
                                          
The host computer communicates with one or more SCSI Enclosure Services (SES) controllers in the enclosure via a SCSI interface which may be Parallel SCSI, FC-AL, SAS, or SSA.  Each SES controller has a SCSI identity (address) and so can accept direct SCSI commands.

Implemented commands
The following SCSI commands are implemented by standalone enclosure services devices:

Note 1: The initiator needs to send a SCSI inquiry to interrogate the SCCS bit which says whether the SES controller has this command.

SCSI